The Sterile Cuckoo (released in the UK as Pookie) is a 1969 American comedy-drama film by producer-director Alan J. Pakula that tells the story of an eccentric young couple whose relationship deepens despite their differences and inadequacies. It stars Liza Minnelli, Wendell Burton, and Tim McIntire.

The film was adapted by Alvin Sargent from the 1965 novel by John Nichols, directed by Pakula in his directing debut, and was released by Paramount Pictures.

The film received two Oscar nominations for the 42nd Academy Awards: Liza Minnelli for Best Actress in a Leading Role, and Fred Karlin & Dory Previn's song "Come Saturday Morning" (performed by the Sandpipers) for Best Original Song.

Plot
Mary Ann "Pookie" Adams is a quirky oddball who meets quiet, reserved Jerry Payne while waiting for a bus heading to their colleges; both are freshmen and their colleges are near each other. Jerry immediately sees that Pookie is different, even strange: she lies to a nun on the bus so the nun will switch seats with her.

As Jerry is beginning to settle into college life with his roommate, Charlie Schumacher, the aggressive Pookie arrives unannounced one Saturday morning. Pookie and Jerry spend much time together over the weekend, and soon begin to see each other regularly.

Jerry falls in love with Pookie, but their different personalities start to pull them apart. After they have sex, Pookie tells Jerry she might be pregnant. When the pregnancy scare is over, Jerry wants to spend spring break alone to catch up on his studies. Pookie pleads to stay with him, and he relents.

A week alone with the needy, somewhat unstable Pookie makes Jerry realize that they need time apart. Later he discovers that she has dropped out of school, and he finds her in the same boardinghouse where she had been staying the first time she visited him. He puts her on a bus for home and the young lovers part ways.

Cast
 Liza Minnelli as Mary Ann "Pookie" Adams
 Wendell Burton as Jerry Payne
 Tim McIntire as Charlie Schumacher

Production
Much of The Sterile Cuckoo was filmed at Hamilton College in Clinton, New York. Some of it was filmed in Sylvan Beach, New York, including the Sylvan Beach Union Chapel. Some scenes, including the later bus-stop scenes, were filmed at the central park in Vernon Center, New York. The first bus-stop scene was filmed in front of the Ontario State Bank Block at 300 South Euclid Avenue in Ontario, California.

Reception
The film was well-received by critics. It grossed $14 million in the United States and Canada, making it the 13th highest-grossing film of 1969.

Awards and nominations

See also
 List of American films of 1969

References

External links
 
 Filming of The Sterile Cuckoo at Hamilton College

1969 films
1960s coming-of-age comedy-drama films
1960s teen comedy-drama films
American coming-of-age comedy-drama films
American teen comedy-drama films
1960s English-language films
Films based on American novels
Films directed by Alan J. Pakula
Films scored by Fred Karlin
Films set in New York (state)
Films shot in New York (state)
Films set in universities and colleges
Paramount Pictures films
Films with screenplays by Alvin Sargent
1969 directorial debut films
1969 comedy films
1969 drama films
1960s American films